Anvesh Michael is an Indian film director, producer, screenwriter and actor.In 2020, Anvesh made his directorial debut with Kotha Poradu for Aha that released on 8 February 2020.

He made his first appearance in 2017's Nirudyoga Natulu directed by Rohit and Sasi. Soon after which he was approached by Raj Rachakonda for a supporting role in Chintakindi Mallesham's biopic starring Priyadarshi, also titled Mallesham.

Filmography

References

External links

Living people
Telugu screenwriters
Telugu film directors
21st-century Indian film directors
Indian emigrants to the United States
21st-century Indian male writers
1979 births
21st-century Indian screenwriters
Screenwriters from Telangana
Film directors from Telangana
Male actors in Telugu cinema
Telugu male actors
Indian male television actors
Male actors in Telugu television
Indian male film actors